Lucas York Black (born November 29, 1982) is an American film and television actor. He is best known as the main character Sean Boswell in The Fast and the Furious: Tokyo Drift (2006), of which he would later reprise the character in Furious 7 (2015) and F9 (2021), along with his other known roles such as Caleb Temple in the CBS television series American Gothic (1995–1996), and Special Agent Christopher LaSalle on CBS's NCIS: New Orleans (2014–2019). His notable films include Sling Blade (1996), Flash (1997), Crazy in Alabama (1999), All the Pretty Horses (2000), Friday Night Lights (2004), Jarhead (2005), Get Low (2009), Legion (2010), Seven Days in Utopia (2011), and 42 (2013).

Early life
Black was born in Decatur, Alabama, to Jan Gillespie, an office worker, and Larry Black, a museum employee. He has two older siblings and was raised a Southern Baptist. He grew up in Speake, Alabama, played football for the Speake Bobcats, and graduated from high school in May 2001.

Career
At age 11, Black made his film debut in Kevin Costner's film The War. He subsequently was cast as Caleb Temple in CBS's television series American Gothic, which ran from 1995 to 1996, and in the films Sling Blade, Ghosts of Mississippi, and The X-Files. Later Black starred as Conner Strong in the TV film Flash (1997), which aired on The Wonderful World of Disney; in the movie his character visits a horse every day in the hope of buying it.

Black played a supporting role as Oakley in the historical drama Cold Mountain (2003). In 2004, he starred as Vernon, an autistic piano prodigy, in the indie musical drama Killer Diller (2004), and as Mike Winchell in the football-themed drama Friday Night Lights (2004), directed by Peter Berg.

Black starred as Nat Banyon in the indie thriller film Deepwater (2005), directed by David S. Marfield; as Chris Kruger in the Gulf War-themed drama film Jarhead (2005), directed by Sam Mendes; and as Sean Boswell in the third The Fast and the Furious film, The Fast and the Furious: Tokyo Drift (2006), directed by Justin Lin. He described Tokyo Drift as the one in which he "had the most fun."

Black starred as Buddy in the indie drama Get Low (2009), directed by Aaron Schneider; as Jeep Hanson in the Bible-themed fantasy thriller Legion (2010); and as Luke Chisholm, a talented young golfer set on making the pro tour, in the indie golfing film Seven Days in Utopia (2010).

He portrayed the Brooklyn Dodgers shortstop Pee Wee Reese in the drama film 42 (2013). Black, having done previous sports films and played sports early in his life, found the filming experience "a lot more enjoyable because you get to reminisce about the days when I used to play, and then you get the experience of being on a team again with the actors and have that camaraderie with the players".

In 2014, Lucas was cast in NCIS: New Orleans as NCIS Special Agent LaSalle, a no-nonsense agent with a "work hard, play hard" motto.

In 2015, Black returned to play Sean Boswell in a cameo appearance in Furious 7. Sean did not appear in the eighth installment, The Fate of the Furious, and in July 2016, Black explained on The Chris Mannix Show that he could not return due to his schedule with NCIS: New Orleans.

In November 2019, Black left the series NCIS: New Orleans to devote more time to his family.

He also returned to the Fast & Furious franchise, reprising his role as Sean in F9 in 2021.

Personal life
Black married Maggie O'Brien, a lawyer, in 2010. They have three children. After he left NCIS New Orleans, he started to upload fishing videos to YouTube. He is a Christian.

Filmography

Film

Television

Awards and nominations

References

External links

 
 

1982 births
20th-century American male actors
21st-century American male actors
American child models
American male child actors
American male film actors
Male models from Alabama
American male television actors
Living people
Male actors from Alabama
People from Decatur, Alabama